O garimpeiro is a novel written by the Brazilian writer Bernardo Guimarães. It was first published in 1872. 

In 1920 it was made into a film titled O Garimpeiro (film). 

1872 Brazilian novels
Portuguese-language novels
Novels by Bernardo Guimarães